Berkelbacteria (formerly  ACD58) is a bacterial phylum with candidate status, meaning there are no cultured representatives for this group. It is part of the Candidate Phyla Radiation.

Berkelbacteria was first reported in 2012, at which time it was classified as a divergent lineage of Parcubacteria (OD1) and referred to as ACD58. It was proposed as a phylum in 2014. Representatives of this phylum have been detected in a variety of environments, including a deep thermokarst lake in the Sasapimakwananisikw River Valley (QC, Canada), an acetate-amended alluvial aquifer adjacent to the Colorado River (CO, USA), and marine sediments from the Peru Margin seafloor.

References 

Bacteria described in the 21st century
Candidatus taxa
Bacteria phyla